István Szenes was a Hungarian former figure skater who won three Hungarian national titles in the 1950s. He placed sixth at the 1955 European Championships in Budapest, 11th at the 1955 World Championships in Vienna, and eighth at the 1956 European Championships in Paris. He married German figure skater Ina Bauer.

Competitive highlights

References 

Kurzen Lebenslauf: Istvan Szene >> Geb.20.01.1938 Budapest >> Ungarische Meister 1953,54,56 >> EM 1955 6.Pl WM 1955 11 Pl. >> EM 1956 8. Pl. >> Flüchtling 1956 >> Solist bei verschiedenen Eisrevuen, als letze bei Ice Follies USA >>dort habe ich mein Frau kennengelernt >> 1967 mit ihr nach Krefeld >> Hochzeit 1968 >> Eiskunstlauftrainer bei KEV >> 1978 Mitgründer der EVK, Geschäftsführer und Trainer bis 2008.

Hungarian male single skaters
Living people
Year of birth missing (living people)